UT Law may refer to:

 University of Toledo College of Law
 University of Tennessee College of Law
 University of Texas School of Law